The comprehensive discography of Praga Khan, a Belgium-based new beat artist, consists of all works recorded by Maurice Engelen. also known as Praga Khan.

101
Singles
 1988 Rock to the Beat
 1989 Move Your Body
 1989 Just as Long as I Got You (House Mix)
 1989 It's Not Over
 1990 Hear Me Coming
 1990 Busy ZZee is in Town!

2 Body's
Singles
 1989 B'Gay/Astoria (Split single with Spaghetti's)
 1990 4 Dancetrax
 1996 Astoria (Remixes)

Alpha Beta
Singles
 1989 Games for Boys
 1990 Oh You!/Satisfaction (Split single with Miss Lie)

Angel Ice
Singles
 1991 Je N'Aime Que Toi
 1991 Girls Come Later
 1991 N'Aie Pas Peur

Anthony Prince
Singles
 1996 Vox-O-Matic

Baba Yaga
Singles
 1995 Rave Planet

Babe Instinct
Singles
 1997 Disco Babes from Outer Space

Boy Toy
Singles
 1989 Touch My Body

Channel X
Studio albums
 1994 To the Top
 1997 Tuned In... Turned On

Singles
 1991 Rave the Rhythm
 1991 Groove to Move
 1992 A Million Colours
 1994 Take It to the Top
 1995 Love is Everything
 1996 The Rhythm of the Night
 1996 Feel My Love / Rave in the Key of X
 1997 Keep on Movin'
 All Your Love
 So High

Code Red
Singles
 1991 In Your Dreams / Dreams Forever
 1992 Dreamer Dream
 1993 Good Feelings

Digital Orgasm
Studio Albums
 1992 Appearances Are Deceptive (also released as DO It or Come Dancin in some regions)

Singles
 1991 Moog Eruption
 1991 Running Out of Time
 1991 Startouchers
 1991 Guilty of Love

Dirty Harry
Singles
 1988 D'Bop
 1989 Double B

DNM
Singles
 1989 French Kiss

E-Angel
Singles
 1996 Fly Me Over the Rainbow

Electric Shock
Singles
 1988 Don't Talk About Sex

The Executive Board
Singles
 1988 I Do Anything

Forza
Singles
 1990 Viva Belgica

Groove Reactor
Singles
 1992 Magick

Heaven is Venus
Singles
 1994 Be My Drug

Heavenly Bodies
Singles
 1996 Temptation

The Immortals
Studio albums
 1994 Mortal Kombat: The Album

Singles
 1993 Mortal Kombat
 1994 Sonya (Go Go Go)

Kaotix
Singles
 1997 Suburban Trancemission

Lina
Singles
 1990 Beats of Love

Lords of Acid

 1991 Lust
 1994 Voodoo-U
 1997 Our Little Secret
 2000 Farstucker
 2012 Deep Chills
 2018 Pretty in Kink

M.N.O.
Singles
 1991 God of Abraham

Major Problem
Singles
 1989 Acid Queen
 1989 I Still Have a Dream
 1990 Love Parasite

Moments of Ecstasy
Singles
 1988 You and Me
 1989 Wanna Get Out!

Mr. & Mrs. Freak
Singles
 1996 Hey Hey Hey
 Party 'N' Jam

Musical Reporters
Singles
 1987 Blow Job (It's Hard to be President)

Nasty Thoughts
Singles
 1988 Acid Sex
 1989 Rock the House

Phantasia
Singles
 1991 Violet Skies
 1991 Inner Light

Praga Khan

Studio Albums
 1993 A Spoonful of Miracle
 1996 Conquers Your Love
 1998 Pragamatic
 1999 Twenty First Century Skin
 2000 Mutant Funk
 2002 Freakazoids
 2004 Electric Religion
 2006 Soundscraper
 2013 Soulsplitter

Quinine
Studio albums
 1995 Regrets Only

Singles
 1996 Dreamscape

Rhythm Kings
Singles
 1989 A la Recherche du Temps Perdue
 1989 One for the Money

Save Sex
Singles
 1987 I Don't Do a Thing

Science Lab
Singles
 1991 Flesh & Blood

Shakti
Studio albums
 1987 Demonic Forces
 1990 Shakti

Singles
 1988 Forbidden Dreams/The Awakening

Subtrance
Singles
 1995 Without?

Tattoo of Pain
Studio Albums
 1996 Vengeance is Mine

Time Zone
Singles
 1991 World of God
 1991 Praise God

Tribe 22
Singles
 1988 Aciiiiiiied - New Beat

Wild Girls
Singles
 1996 Party Time

Zsa Zsa Deluxe
Studio Albums
 1998 EigenWijs

Singles
 1997 Lekker High
 1997 Lekker High Remixes
 1997 GSM Syndroom
 1997 DeDoofPot

Remixes
 White Zombie - Electric Head Pt. 1 (Satan in High Heels Mix) (credited as The Damage Twins)
 Rob Zombie - Superbeast (Porno Holocaust Mix) (credited as The Damage Twins)* Pussy

See also
Praga Khan discography

References

Engelen, Maurice